Golobinjek pri Planini is a small settlement south of Planina pri Sevnici in the Municipality of Šentjur, in eastern Slovenia. The settlement, and the entire municipality, are included in the Savinja Statistical Region, which is in the Slovenian portion of the historical Duchy of Styria.

Name
The name of the settlement was changed from Golobinjek to Golobinjek pri Planini in 1953.

References

External links
Golobinjek pri Planini at Geopedia

Populated places in the Municipality of Šentjur